Ángel Moreno may refer to:

Ángel Moreno (footballer), Spanish footballer
Ángel Moreno (baseball), Mexican baseball player